John Ruhl may refer to:
 John Ruhl (physicist)
 John Ruhl (sculptor)